The Rajanganaya Dam (also sometimes called Rajangana) is an irrigation dam built across the Kala Oya river, at Rajanganaya, bordering the North Western and North Central provinces of Sri Lanka.

See also 
 List of dams and reservoirs in Sri Lanka

References

External links 
 

Dams in Sri Lanka
Buildings and structures in North Western Province, Sri Lanka
Buildings and structures in North Central Province, Sri Lanka
Gravity dams
Dams completed in 1950